Calcarobiotus is a genus of tardigrades belonging to the family Macrobiotidae.

The species of this genus are found in Africa.

Species:

Calcarobiotus digeronimoi 
Calcarobiotus filmeri 
Calcarobiotus gildae 
Calcarobiotus hainanensis 
Calcarobiotus imperialis 
Calcarobiotus longinoi 
Calcarobiotus occultus 
Calcarobiotus parvicalcar 
Calcarobiotus polygonatus 
Calcarobiotus tetrannulatus

References

Parachaela
Tardigrade genera